Nuland is a village in the Dutch province of North Brabant. It is located about 8 km (5 mi) east of 's-Hertogenbosch.

Nuland was a separate municipality until 1993 when it merged with Geffen and Vinkel to create the new municipality of Maasdonk. This lasted until 2015 when Maasdonk was dissolved, and Nuland became part of 's-Hertogenbosch.

References

Boroughs of 's-Hertogenbosch
Populated places in North Brabant
Former municipalities of North Brabant
Municipalities of the Netherlands disestablished in 1993